The white-tailed jay (Cyanocorax mystacalis) is a species of bird in the family Corvidae.
It is found in Ecuador and Peru. Its natural habitats are subtropical or tropical dry forest and subtropical or tropical moist lowland forest. It exhibits no sexual dimorphism. it forages in the open on beetles, ants, and other insects, with a vocal repetitive hollow call.

References

white-tailed jay
Birds of Ecuador
Birds of Peru
Birds of the Tumbes-Chocó-Magdalena
white-tailed jay
Taxonomy articles created by Polbot